Edwin Mills may refer to:

Edwin Mills (actor), American actor in Return to the Planet of the Apes
Edwin Mills (athlete) (1878–1946), British tug-of-war competitor
Edwin Mills (cricketer) (1857-1899), English cricketer
Edwin Mills (economist) (born 1928), American economist